A bivalent is one pair of chromosomes (sister chromatids) in a tetrad. A tetrad is the association of a pair of  homologous chromosomes (4 sister chromatids) physically held together by at least one DNA crossover. This physical attachment allows for alignment and segregation of the homologous chromosomes in the first meiotic division. In most organisms, each replicated chromosome (composed of two identical sisters chromatid) elicits formation of DNA double-strand breaks during the leptotene phase. These breaks are repaired by homologous recombination, that uses the homologous chromosome as a template for repair. The search for the homologous target, helped by numerous proteins collectively referred as the synaptonemal complex, cause the two homologs to pair, between the leptotene and the pachytene phases of meiosis I.

Formation 
The formation of a bivalent occurs during the first division of meiosis (in the zygotene stage of meiotic prophase 1). In most organisms, each replicated chromosome (composed of two identical sister chromatids) elicits formation of DNA double-strand breaks during the leptotene phase. These breaks are repaired by homologous recombination, that uses the homologous chromosome as a template for repair. The search for the homologous target, helped by numerous proteins collectively referred as the synaptonemal complex, cause the two homologs to pair, between the leptotene and the pachytene phases of meiosis I. Resolution of the DNA recombination intermediate into a crossover exchanges DNA segments between the two homologous chromosomes at a site called a chiasma (plural: chiasmata). This physical strand exchange and the cohesion between the sister chromatids along each chromosome ensure robust pairing of the homologs in diplotene phase. The structure, visible by microscopy, is called a bivalent. Resolution of the DNA recombination intermediate into a crossover exchanges DNA segments between the two homologous chromosomes at a site called a chiasma (plural: chiasmata). This physical strand exchange and the cohesion between the sister chromatids along each chromosome ensure robust pairing of the homologs in diplotene phase. The structure, visible by microscopy, is called a bivalent. An intricate molecular machinery is at the core of gene expression regulation in every cell. During the initial stages of organismal development, the coordinated activation of diverse transcriptional programs is crucial and must be carefully executed to shape every organ and tissue. Bivalent which promoters and poised enhancers are regulatory regions decorated with histone marks that are associated with both positive and negative transcriptional outcomes. Finally, we highlight the potential link between bivalency and cancer which could drive biomedical research in disease etiology and treatment.

The information of a one gene should be the different in executive way in the cell types to achieve main program in this diversity. Chromatin is carrier of the instructions and also the DNA surrounded by the histones shows impact of the nucleosome which we can see this is the basic unit. The packed gives information for regulation nucleosome of physical barrier they show impact on the chromatin remodelers parts N- terminal parts of histone particle, histone tails, covalent post-translational modifies and also creates an epigenetics of [PCG] and [TRXG] plays an initial role these mutations caused in groups from transformation in Drosophila shows a clearcut information

Structure 
A bivalent is the association of two replicated homologous chromosomes having exchanged DNA strand in at least one site called chiasmata. Each bivalent contains a minimum of one chiasma and rarely more than three. This limited number (much lower than the number of initiated DNA breaks) is due to crossover interference, a poorly understood phenomenon that limits the number of resolution of repair events into crossover in the vicinity of another pre-existing crossover outcome, thereby limiting the total number of crossovers per homologs pair. A bivalent is the association of two replicated homologous chromosomes having exchanged DNA strand in at least one site called chiasmata. Each bivalent contains a minimum of one chiasma and rarely more than three. This limited number (much lower than the number of initiated DNA breaks) is due to crossover interference, a poorly understood phenomenon that limits the number of resolutions of repair events into crossover in the vicinity of another pre-existing crossover outcome, thereby limiting the total number of crossovers per homologs pair. Bivalent gene is a gene marked with both H3K4me3 and H3K27me3 epigenetic modification in the same area of this kind and is proposed to play a pivotal role related to pluripotency in embryonic stem (ES) cells. Bivalent promoters marked with both H3K27me3 and H3K4me3 histone modifications are characteristic of poised promoters in embryonic stem (ES) cells. The model of poised promoters postulates that bivalent chromatin in ES cells is resolved to Mono valency upon differentiation. With the availability of single-cell RNA sequencing (scRNA-seq) data, subsequent switches in transcriptional state at bivalent promoters can be studied more closely.

Function 
At the meiotic metaphase I, the cytoskeleton puts the bivalents under tension by pulling each homolog in opposite direction (contrary to mitotic division where the forces are exerted on each chromatid). The anchorage of the cytoskeleton to the chromosomes takes place at the centromere thanks to a protein complex called kinetochore. This tension results in the alignment of the bivalent at the center of the cell, the chiasmata and the distal cohesion of the sister chromatids being the anchor point sustaining the force exerted on the whole structure. Impressively, human female primary oocytes remains in this tension state for decades (from the establishment of the oocyte in metaphase I during embryonic development, to the ovulation event in adulthood that resume the meiotic division), highlighting the robustness of the chiasma and the cohesion that hold the bivalents together. The cell transcription regulates of developmental genes We develop an approach for capturing genes undergoing transcriptional switching by detecting 'bimodal' gene expression patterns from scRNA-seq data. We integrate the identification of bimodal genes in ES cell differentiation with analysis of chromatin state and for kind of then identify clear cell-state dependent patterns of bimodal, bivalent genes. We show that binarization of bimodal genes can be used to identify differentially expressed genes from fractional ON/OFF proportions. In time series data from differentiating cells, we build a pseudo time approximation and use a hidden Markov model to infer gene activity switching pseudo times, which we use to infer a regulatory network. We identify pathways of switching during differentiation, novel details of those pathway, and transcription factor coordination with downstream targets.

Conclusions: Genes with expression levels too low to be informative in conventional scRNA analysis can be used to infer transcriptional switching networks that connect transcriptional activity to chromatin state.  in with analysis of chromatin state and for kind of then identify clear cell-state dependent patterns of bimodal, bivalent genes. We show that binarization of bimodal genes can be used to identify differentially expressed genes from fractional ON/OFF proportions. In time series data from differentiating cells, we build a pseudo time approximation and use a hidden Markov model to infer gene activity switching pseudo times, which we use to infer a regulatory network. We identify pathways of switching during differentiation, novel details of those pathway, and transcription factor coordination with downstream targets. This offers a novel and productive means of inferring regulatory networks from scRNA-seq data.

Keywords: Bimodality; Bivalency; Chromatin state; Embryonic stem cells; Genome regulatory network; Hidden Markov model; Pseudo time; scRNA-seq.

References
Blanco E., Gonzalez Ramirez M., Alcaine-colet , A., Aranda the bivalent genome ; characterization structure trends in genetics

. Thomson JA, itskovitz-Eldor J,Shapiro SS, et al.

. Santos-Rosa H, Schneider R, Beernstein BE, et al. Methylation of histone H3 K4

. Ringrose L, ehret H, paro R. District contribution of histones H3 lysine 9 and 27
Chromosomes
Cell cycle